The Martin Marietta Spacemaster was a proposed configuration for what became the Space Shuttle, which featured an X-24-derived orbiter, and an unusual "catamaran style" booster stage. During launch and ascent, the orbiter would be located in a recess in the booster. The booster's 14 engines would be located in clusters of seven, at the bottom of both halves of the booster. Unlike the final design for the Space Shuttle, the Spacemaster would lack an external tank, and the boosters would be joined, by means of connecting struts which would also serve as the mounting for the orbiter.

The concept was evaluated in 1967, but was rejected. Martin Marietta went on to produce the Space Shuttle external tank (ET) for the final STS Space Shuttle design (by Lockheed Martin after a merger with Lockheed).

A model of the Martin Marietta Spacemaster is in the collection of the Smithsonian National Air and Space Museum.

See also
List of space launch system designs
Space Shuttle program

References

External links
Spacemaster scale model in black (in the foreground to the right)

Space Shuttle program
Cancelled space launch vehicles